Pycnarmon diaphana is a moth in the family Crambidae. It was described by Pieter Cramer in 1777. It is found in Cameroon, the Democratic Republic of the Congo (Equateur, Katanga, Bas Congo, West Kasai), Equatorial Guinea, Ethiopia, Seychelles (Mahé, North), Sierra Leone, South Africa, Zambia, Zimbabwe, India and Sri Lanka.

The larvae feed on Sideroxylon ferrugineum.

References

Spilomelinae
Moths described in 1777
Moths of Africa
Moths of Asia
Moths of Sri Lanka